Pecorino di Filiano is a firm cheese from the Italian region of Basilicata made from sheep milk. It was granted protected designation of origin (PDO) in 2007.

Pecorino di Filiano is produced in the province of Potenza, in the communes of Atella, Avigliano, Balvano, Baragiano, Barile, Bella, Cancellara, Castelgrande, Filiano, Forenza, Ginestra, Maschito, Melfi, Muro Lucano, Pescopagano, Picerno, Pietragalla, Pignola, Potenza, Rapolla, Rapone, Rionero in Vulture, Ripacandida, Ruoti, Ruvo del Monte, San Fele, Savoia di Lucania, Tito, Vaglio, Vietri di Potenza.

Every year on the first Sunday of September in Filiano is organized the pecorino di Filiano festival, where the cheese, produced by various farmers, is available to taste and buy.

See also
 
 Pecorino
 List of Italian PDO cheeses

References

Lucanian cheeses
Sheep's-milk cheeses
Italian products with protected designation of origin
Cheeses with designation of origin protected in the European Union